Karwandania is a genus of moths in the family Gelechiidae. It contains the species Karwandania chimabacchella, which is found in Iran.

The wingspan is about 17 mm. The forewings are dirty grey with vague markings. The hindwings are dark grey.

References

Gelechiinae